European Parliament elections in Sweden took place on 25 May 2014. At the election, twenty Members of the European Parliament (MEPs) were from the Swedish constituency. In the election, voters choose members of registered Swedish parties whose elected members then form political groups in the European Parliament, together with members of parties from other Member States with the same political affiliation.

Previous result
Distribution of Sweden's mandate during the previous election, turnout was 45.53% in 2009

Results

Elected members
Moderate Party

 Anna Maria Corazza Bildt 
 Gunnar Hökmark
 Christofer Fjellner

Centre Party
 Fredrick Federley

Liberal People's Party

 Marit Paulsen
 Cecilia Wikström

Christian Democrats

 Lars Adaktusson

Social Democrats

 Marita Ulvskog
 Olle Ludvigsson
 Jytte Guteland
 Jens Nilsson
 Anna Hedh

Left Party

 Malin Björk

Green Party

 Isabella Lövin
 Peter Eriksson 
 Bodil Ceballos
 Max Andersson

Sweden Democrats

 Kristina Winberg
 Peter Lundgren

Feminist Initiative

 Soraya Post

References

Sweden
European Parliament elections in Sweden
European